Local nature reserves (LNRs) in England are designated by local authorities under Section 21 of the National Parks and Access to the Countryside Act 1949. LNRs are sites which have a special local interest either biologically or geologically. Local authorities have a duty to care for them, and must control the sites by owning or leasing them, or by having an agreement with the owners.  The local authorities can apply local byelaws to manage and protect LNRs.

As of April 2020, there are 65 LNRs in Hampshire, of which 28 are Sites of Special Scientific Interest, 15 are Ramsar sites, 15 are Special Areas of Conservation, 16 are Special Protection Areas and one is a national nature reserve and one is a Nature Conservation Review site. Two sites are managed by the Hampshire and Isle of Wight Wildlife Trust.

Key

Other designations and wildlife trust management
HIWWT = Hampshire and Isle of Wight Wildlife Trust
NCR = Nature Conservation Review site
NNR = National nature reserve
Ramsar = Ramsar site, an internationally important wetland site
SAC = Special Area of Conservation
SM = Scheduled monument
SPA = Special Protection Area 
SSSI = Site of Special Scientific Interest

Sites

See also
List of Sites of Special Scientific Interest in Hampshire
Hampshire and Isle of Wight Wildlife Trust

Notes

References

Sources

 
Hampshire
Local Nature Reserves